Harpreet Singh Bhatia (born 11 August 1991) is an Indian cricketer who plays for the Chhattisgarh cricket team and Central Zone in Indian domestic cricket. He is a left-hand batsman and right-arm medium pace bowler. He was a member of the Pune Warriors India squad in the 2011 Indian Premier League. He represented India at the 2010 ICC Under-19 Cricket World Cup.

In April 2017, it was announced that he had been signed by Royal Challengers Bangalore to take part in the remainder of the Indian Premier League. After going unsold in the auction, he was picked up by Royal Challengers Bangalore after an injury suffered by Sarfaraz Khan.

He was the leading run-scorer for Madhya Pradesh in the 2017–18 Ranji Trophy, with 629 runs in seven matches. He was also the leading run-scorer for Madhya Pradesh in the 2018–19 Vijay Hazare Trophy, with 271 runs in five matches.

Ahead of the 2018–19 Ranji Trophy, he transferred from Madhya Pradesh to Chhattisgarh. He was the leading run-scorer for Chhattisgarh in the tournament, with 627 runs in eight matches.

In August 2019, he was named in the India Red team's squad for the 2019–20 Duleep Trophy.

References

External links

1991 births
Living people
Indian cricketers
Chhattisgarh cricketers
Madhya Pradesh cricketers
Central Zone cricketers
Kolkata Knight Riders cricketers
Pune Warriors India cricketers
People from Durg
Cricketers from Chhattisgarh